Doerte Blume is a physicist working at Washington State University.

Biography
Blume completed her undergraduate and obtained a PhD in 1998 from Georg-August-Universität Göttingen, Germany. Her PhD was supervised by Jan Peter Toennies and K. Birgitta Whaley. This included research done at University of California, Berkeley. Following this she completed a post-doc at JILA, University of Colorado Boulder.

Research
Blume conducts research into sub-atomic particles at Washington State University.

In 2022 she obtained a $1million grant from the W. M. Keck Foundation to investigate quantum synchronization.

Honours and awards
 2006 - Washington State University College of Sciences Young Faculty Performance Award
 2010 - Fellow of the American Physical Society for "contributions to physics of weakly-bound quantum clusters and strongly-interacting degenerate Fermi gases in one dimension."
 2014 - Washington State University College of Arts and Sciences Mid-Career Achievement in Scholarship/Creative Activities Award
 2016 - Meyer Distinguished Professorship at Washington State University
 Bush Lectureship at the University of Oklahoma

Publications

References

External links
 
 ICAP2018 - Doerte Blume

Living people
Year of birth missing (living people)
Place of birth missing (living people)
Fellows of the American Physical Society
Washington State University faculty
University of Oklahoma people
Women physicists